Jan Jacobus "Sonny" Silooy (born 31 August 1963) is a Dutch former professional footballer and football manager. His last team as a manager was United Arab Emirates club Al Shabab under 19. His most successful time as a player was in his period with Ajax. He won seven Eredivisie titles, four KNVB Cups, three Johan Cruyff Shields, one UEFA Cup Winners' Cup, one UEFA Cup, one UEFA Super Cup and one Intercontinental Cup.

Club career
Silooy was born in Rotterdam. He played as a right or central defender and is one of the legends of Ajax, where he made his debut on 3 May 1981, playing over 250 league games for the Amsterdam club in two separate periods. Silooy also played for Matra Racing, Arminia Bielefeld, De Graafschap and the amateurs of GVV Unitas from Gorinchem. He played in the 1996 UEFA Champions League Final against Juventus, but missed a key penalty in the shootout which Ajax ultimately lost.

International career
Silooy, a member of the Netherlands national team's squad at the 1983 FIFA World Youth Championship, obtained 25 caps, including eight appearances in Euro 88 qualifying, but never played in a major international competition.

Coaching career
Silooy was also coach of the Jong Ajax youth academy and juniors team. In 2010, he was appointed as head coach of new branch Dayton Dutch Lions.

He left Dayton Dutch Lions to become an assistant coach with the Major League Soccer club D.C. United. In 2015 he was appointed as head coach of Al Shabab under 19.

Honours

Player
Ajax
Eredivisie: 1981–82, 1982–83, 1984–85, 1989–90, 1993–94, 1994–95, 1995–96
KNVB Cup:  1982–83, 1985–86, 1986–87, 1995–96
Johan Cruijff Shield: 1993, 1994, 1995
UEFA Cup Winners' Cup: 1986–87
UEFA Cup: 1991–92
UEFA Super Cup: 1995
UEFA Champions League: 1994–95
Intercontinental Cup: 1995

References

External links
  Profile
  International career
  Ajax.nl – Sonny Silooy to leave Ajax, 7 February 2008

1963 births
Living people
Association football defenders
Dutch footballers
Dutch football managers
Netherlands youth international footballers
Netherlands international footballers
AFC Ajax players
Racing Club de France Football players
Ligue 1 players
Footballers from Rotterdam
De Graafschap players
Arminia Bielefeld players
Dutch people of Indonesian descent
Dutch people of Moluccan descent
Eredivisie players
Dutch expatriate footballers
Expatriate footballers in France
Expatriate footballers in Germany
Bundesliga players
Dayton Dutch Lions coaches
Dutch expatriate sportspeople in France
Dutch expatriate sportspeople in Germany
D.C. United non-playing staff
UEFA Cup winning players
Dutch expatriate football managers
Dutch expatriate sportspeople in the United Arab Emirates
Dutch expatriate sportspeople in the United States
Expatriate soccer managers in the United States
Expatriate football managers in the United Arab Emirates
Association football coaches
Sparta Rotterdam non-playing staff
AFC Ajax non-playing staff